The Cameroon worm lizard (Cynisca schaeferi) is a species of worm lizard in the family Amphisbaenidae. The species is endemic to Cameroon.

Etymology
The specific name, schaeferi, is in honor of German zoologist Hans Schäfer who collected the holotype.

Description

Reproduction
C. schaeferi is oviparous.

References

Further reading
Chirio L, LeBreton M (2007). Atlas des Reptiles du Cameroun. Paris: Muséum national d'Histoire naturelle. 688 pp. . (in French).
Gans C (2005). "Checklist and Bibliography of the Amphisbaenia of the World". Bulletin of the American Museum of Natural History (289): 1–130. (Cynisca schaeferi, p. 29).
Sternfeld R (1912). "Eine neue Scincidengattung aus Südafrika und eine neue Amphisbaenide aus Kamerun ". Sitzungberichte der Gesellschaft Naturforschender Freunde zu Berlin 1912: 248–250. (Chirindia schaeferi, new species, p. 250 + Figure 2). (in German).

Cynisca (lizard)
Reptiles described in 1912
Taxa named by Richard Sternfeld
Endemic fauna of Cameroon
Reptiles of Cameroon